Pentarhizidium is a genus of two Asian fern species. These species have formerly been included in Matteuccia or Onoclea.  Recent genetic analysis has determined that these two species form a discrete clade that is basal to the rest of this fern group, and so have been located in their own genus.  P. orientale is sometimes grown as a garden plant.

Species

References

Polypodiales
Ferns of Asia
Fern genera